SHV Holdings is a privately owned Dutch trading company, regarded as one of the world's largest private trading groups. SHV is a highly diversified company, with interests in transport, retail, oil, food and financial services. It currently employs more than 50,000 people.

History

1896–1939

On 1 April 1896, eight Dutch coal wholesalers merged to found the Steenkolen Handels-Vereniging (Coal-trading company), as a response to the formation of the German Rhenish-Westphalian Coal Syndicate (Rheinisch-Westfälisches Kohlen-Syndikat). By 1904, the company had secured exclusive rights to trade Westphalian coal in the Netherlands. Under the guidance of director Frits "FH" Fentener van Vlissingen, SHV's stature in the Netherlands went from strength to strength. Under his direction, SHV moved its headquarters from Rotterdam to Utrecht, to take advantage of the city's position as the hub of the Dutch railway network. By 1910, SHV had positioned itself as one of the foremost trading forces in the Netherlands.

Thanks to his expertise in the coal trading business, Fentener van Vlissingen was appointed as director of the State Coal Board, which managed coal distribution in the Netherlands during the First World War. Although the Netherlands was neutral, the war years were difficult for SHV, as Westphalian coal output was assigned to support the German war effort. Nevertheless, in 1917 SHV established a holding company, Administratiekantoor Unitas to exploit a German anthracite mine. This entity (simply called "Unitas") became SHV's first investment arm, providing foundation capital for companies like Koninklijke Hoogovens and KLM.

The 1920s also brought about a major change in the Dutch industrial sector: a slump in fishing led to the consolidation of three major shipping companies and their new energy needs also affected the SHV. In response to these changes, SHV established its first oil bunker station and sold crude for the motor vessels of the recently merged shipping companies. The shifts in energy economics in the Netherlands followed changes taking place around the world. In 1914, close to 94% of ships around the world were fuelled by coal; by 1939 this had fallen to 48%. Oil was preferred over coal because it burned more efficiently: in some cases, shipping companies saved up to 40% in operating costs by switching to motor vessels. S.H.V. was directed by Daniel George van Beuningen who took over from his father.

1940–1970

On 10 May 1940, Germany attacked Belgium, France, Luxembourg and the Netherlands. After four days of fighting, the Dutch government capitulated and the occupation of the Netherlands began.

After the war, SHV had to cope with the economic difficulties of a continent in ruins. As coal's importance continued to decrease, SHV expanded its interests in shipping and retail. In 1964, the company established the Makro cash-and-carry stores.

1970–1999

By 1995 SHV was the largest trading company in the Netherlands.

2000–present

In April 2015, SHV completed the takeover of animal feed manufacturer Nutreco

In July 2021, SHV purchased Kiwa, a Dutch testing, inspection and certification (TIC) institution.

Corporate Affairs

Management

Jeroen Drost has been the CEO of SHV Holdings since April 2016.

Logo

The SHV logo is inspired by the coat of arms of Utrecht, to which SHV moved from Rotterdam under the directorship of FH Fentener van Vlissingen.

Companies owned by SHV Holdings
 SHV Energy – Liquefied petroleum gas
 Makro – Food and non-food consumer articles in South America
 Mammoet - Heavy lifting and transport
 ERIKS - A multi-product specialist offering a wide range of mechanical engineering components and technical services to all sections of industry
 Nutreco - Animal nutrition and feed
 NPM Capital - Private equity
 Kiwa - Testing, inspection and certification
 ONE-Dyas - Exploration and production operating company of oil and gas

References

External links

Coal companies of the Netherlands
Companies based in Utrecht (province)
Energy companies of the Netherlands
Holding companies of the Netherlands